The 2008 Malaysia FA Cup was the 19th season of the Malaysia FA Cup. The competition began on 19 February 2008, and ended with the final on 21 June 2008. Shah Alam Stadium hosted the final match.

The tournament was won by title holders Kedah FA, who beat Selangor FA 3–2 in the final.

The cup winner were guaranteed a place in the 2009 AFC Cup.

First round
The first legs were played on 19 February 2008. The second legs were played on 4 March 2008.

|}

Second round
The first legs were played on 21 March 2008. First leg match for Penang FA and Kuala Muda Naza FC were played on 23 March 2008. The second legs were played on 4 March 2008.

|}

Quarter-finals
The first legs were played on 8 April 2008. The second legs were played on 22 April 2008.

|}

Semi-finals
The first legs were played on 14 June 2008. The second legs were played on 17 June 2008.

First leg

Second leg

Kedah won 6–1 on aggregate

Selangor won 3–2 on aggregate

Final

Winners

References

 
Piala FA
2008 domestic association football cups